Hapowal is a village in Shaheed Bhagat Singh Nagar district of Punjab State, India. The village is administrated by Sarpanch an elected representative of the village.

Demography 
As of 2011, Hapowal has a total number of 277 houses and population of 1142 of which 562 include are males while 580 are females according to the report published by Census India in 2011. The literacy rate of Hapowal is 77.66%, higher than the state average of 75.84%. The population of children under the age of 6 years is 144 which is 12.61% of total population of Hapowal, and child sex ratio is approximately 1215 as compared to Punjab state average of 846.

Most of the people are from Schedule Caste which constitutes 52.63% of total population in Hapowal. The town does not have any Schedule Tribe population so far.

As per the report published by Census India in 2011, 316 people were engaged in work activities out of the total population of Hapowal which includes 279 males and 37 females. According to census survey report 2011, 89.56% workers describe their work as main work and 10.44% workers are involved in Marginal activity providing livelihood for less than 6 months.

Education 
The village has a Punjabi medium, co-ed primary school founded in 1957. The schools does not provide mid-day meal. The school provide free education to children between the ages of 6 and 14 as per Right of Children to Free and Compulsory Education Act.

Landmarks 
The village has a Sikh shrine Singh Sabha Gurudwara where a religious fair held at the Gurdwara annually, which attended by people of all religions. Baba Jivan das Kutia, Baba Sobha Singh and Baba Saran Das Ji Palah Wale are religious sites. The village has co-operative bank and ATM facility.

Transport 

See also 
List of villages in India

References

External links 
 Tourism of Punjab
 Census of Punjab
 Locality Based PINCode

Villages in Shaheed Bhagat Singh Nagar district